DeGol Arena is a 3,500-seat multi-purpose arena in Loretto, Pennsylvania. It is home to the Saint Francis University Red Flash men's and women's basketball teams and the men's and women's volleyball teams. It opened in 1972 and is named in honor of Maurice Stokes. The 1991 Northeast Conference men's basketball tournament was held there. It was most recently renovated in 1994 and can hold 3500 fans.

The arena is the centerpiece of the Maurice Stokes Athletic Center.

See also
 List of NCAA Division I basketball arenas

References

1972 establishments in Pennsylvania
Saint Francis Red Flash men's basketball
College basketball venues in the United States
Sports venues in Pennsylvania
Indoor arenas in Pennsylvania
Basketball venues in Pennsylvania
Sports venues completed in 1972